Milan Marčić (born 14 March 1996) is a Serbian  footballer who plays for Javor Ivanjica.

Club career
Born in Zemun, Marčić started his career in the club with the same name, where he passed youth selections and joined the first team at the age of 17. Later he was with Red Star Belgrade youth team, before he left to Portugal, where played with Vitória Guimarães and Moreirense. At the beginning of 2016, Marčić joined Borac Čačak and made his SuperLiga debut in last minutes of match against Spartak Subotica, played on 6 March 2016. In summer 2017, Marčić moved to Covilhã.

References

External links
 
 Milan Marčić stats at utakmica.rs 
 
 

1996 births
Living people
Serbian footballers
Serbian expatriate footballers
People from Zemun
Footballers from Belgrade
Association football midfielders
FK Zemun players
FK Borac Čačak players
Red Star Belgrade footballers
Vitória S.C. players
S.C. Covilhã players
Moreirense F.C. players
FK Javor Ivanjica players
FK Spartak Subotica players
Serbian SuperLiga players
Expatriate footballers in Portugal
Serbian expatriate sportspeople in Portugal